Farmerville is a town in and the parish seat of Union Parish, Louisiana, United States.  It has also been known as Farmersville.  The population was 3,860 at the 2010 census.  It is part of the Monroe Metropolitan Statistical Area. The town is spread about Lake D'Arbonne, a popular fishing and boating waterway.

Geography

Climate
The climate in this area is characterized by hot, humid summers and generally mild to cool winters.  According to the Köppen Climate Classification system, Farmerville has a humid subtropical climate, abbreviated "Cfa" on climate maps.

2022 tornado
On December 13, 2022, the northern part of the town was struck by an EF3 tornado that damaged or destroyed structures and injured 14 people. The tornado caused $1.2 million in damage, with most of the damage coming from the town.

Demographics

2020 census

As of the 2020 United States census, there were 3,366 people, 954 households, and 552 families residing in the town.

2000 census
As of the census of 2000, there were 3,808 people, 1,366 households, and 932 families residing in the town. The racial makeup of the town was 34.03% White, 63.52% African American, 0.03% Native American, 0.68% Asian, 0.03% Pacific Islander, 1.23% from other races, and 0.47% from two or more races. Hispanic or Latino of any race were 1.71% of the population.

There were 1,366 households, out of which 33.9% had children under the age of 18 living with them, 35.8% were married couples living together, 28.9% had a female householder with no husband present, and 31.7% were non-families. 28.0% of all households were made up of individuals, and 11.1% had someone living alone who was 65 years of age or older. The average household size was 2.53 and the average family size was 3.11.

In the town, the population was spread out, with 28.8% under the age of 18, 10.3% from 18 to 24, 24.9% from 25 to 44, 18.8% from 45 to 64, and 17.2% who were 65 years of age or older. The median age was 34 years. For every 100 females, there were 85.9 males. For every 100 females age 18 and over, there were 76.7 males.

The median income for a household in the town was $23,598, and the median income for a family was $26,756. Males had a median income of $26,798 versus $19,250 for females. The per capita income for the town was $12,258. About 23.3% of families and 30.0% of the population were below the poverty line, including 44.3% of those under age 18 and 27.5% of those age 65 or over.

Education
The Union Parish School District covers education in the Farmerville area.

Schools
 Union Parish Elementary School
 Union Parish Junior High School
 Union Parish High School
 Union Christian Academy
 Downsville Charter School
 D'Arbonne Woods Charter School

Former Schools
Farmerville High School

Notable people
 Thomas "Bud" Brady, member of the Louisiana House of Representatives from 1976 to 1988 from La Salle Parish; a radio announcer in Farmerville in the early 1960s 
 Donovan Chapman, Country music artist
 James Walter Elder, was a member of the United States House of Representatives and a mayor of Farmerville
 William C. Feazel, interim U.S. Senator in 1948; member of the Louisiana House of Representatives from Ouachita Parish from 1932–1936
 Alton Hardy Howard, co-founder of Howard Brothers Discount Stores; gospel songwriter; born in Rocky Branch community in 1925, based in West Monroe
 W. L. "Jack" Howard, five-term mayor of Monroe and partner of Howard Brothers Discount Stores, was born in the Rocky Branch community in 1921.
 V. E. Howard, Church of Christ clergyman who founded the International Gospel Hour on radio, based in Texarkana, Texas; interred at Rocky Branch Cemetery 
 Jay McCallum (born 1960), state court judge since 2003; state representative for Lincoln and Union parishes from 1992 to 2003.
 James Peyton Smith (1925-2006), state representative from Union and Morehouse parishes from 1964 to 1972; namesake of bridge over Lake D'Arbonne in Farmerville

References

External links
Town of Farmerville

Towns in Louisiana
Towns in Union Parish, Louisiana
Parish seats in Louisiana
Towns in Monroe, Louisiana metropolitan area